Thriamvos Serviana Football Club is a Greek football club, based in Serviana, Ioannina, Greece.

Honours

Domestic

 Epirus FCA champion: 1
 2017–18
 Epirus FCA Cup Winners: 2
 2017–18, 2018–19

References

Football clubs in Epirus
Ioannina (regional unit)
Association football clubs established in 1981
1981 establishments in Greece
Gamma Ethniki clubs